Lasiommata felix, the Arabian wall brown, is a butterfly in the family Nymphalidae. It is found in south-western Saudi Arabia and Yemen. The habitat consists of the western escarpment of the Arabian Peninsula.

References

Lasiommata
Butterflies described in 1929